The Rubis class is a series of nuclear-powered attack submarines operated by the French Navy. The class comprises six vessels, the first entering service in 1983 and the last in 1993, with another two being cancelled. All six submarines of the Rubis class are based at Toulon and are part of the Escadrille de sous-marins nucléaires d'attaque. Smaller than contemporary designs of other major world navies, the Rubis class shares many of its system designs with the conventionally-powered . In the late 1980s, the Rubis class was proposed as an export to Canada in their plan to acquire nuclear-powered submarines.

The submarines of the class were built in two batches, with the final two built to an improved standard to reduce noise emissions that plagued the original design. Dubbed the AMÉTHYSTE rebuild, the first four hulls were refitted to its standard until they were practically indistinguishable from the final two hulls. Four of the submarines have had significant incidents in their careers and one, Saphir was taken out of service our of service in 2019, followed by Rubis in 2022. The French Navy is replacing the Rubis class with the s.

Background and design

The Rubis class was the second attempt at constructing a nuclear-powered attack submarine. The first, also dubbed Rubis, had been authorised in 1964 but cancelled in 1968, just as the first boat was about to commence construction. However, a new naval plan in 1972, called Plan Bleu, stated a requirement for 20 attack submarines of both nuclear-powered and conventionally-powered types. The new design, designated Type SNA 72 and called a sous-marin nucléaire de chasse was smaller than any contemporary nuclear-powered attack submarine design in other major world navies. The small hull design was capable due the development of a compact, integrated nuclear reactor-exchanger with turbo-electric drives.

The boats are of single-hull construction made of 80 HLES high elasticity steel and the forward diving planes are situated high on the conning tower.

The submarines are powered by a CAS-48 pressurised water nuclear reactor creating 48 megawatts utilising 7% low-enriched uranium, driving two 3,950-kilowatt turbo-alternator sets. These power a single propeller creating . At low speeds, the submarines use natural circulation to reduce noise emissions. In case of a reactor failure, the Rubis class have an emergency electric motor powered by batteries supplied by a SEMT-Pielstick 16PA4 diesel generator set creating 480 kW. Manned by two crews, they have an active yearly service of 240 days. The crews initially numbered 66 including 9 officers.

Sharing sensors and weapons with the Agosta class, the Rubis class mount four  torpedo tubes forward. The submarines have storage for a mix of 14 F17 Mod 2 torpedoes and SM39 Exocet anti-ship missiles. Each torpedo carries a  warhead. The submarines can fire and guide two torpedoes simultaneously. Instead of torpedoes, the submarine can embark up to FG 29 naval mines. The submarines initially mounted a DRUA 33 navigation/search radar, ARUR and ARUD electronic warfare systems, DSUV 22 multi-function passive sonar array, DUUA 2B active sonar, and DUUX 2 acoustic intercept sonar.

AMÉTHYSTE rebuild
The initial design of the Rubis proved to be problematic with unexpectedly high noise levels. This led to the Améthyste silencing program (AMÉlioration  Tactique HYdrodynamique Silence Transmission Ecoute, literally Silent Acoustic Transmission Tactical Hydrodynamic Improvement) which was applied during construction of the fifth (Améthyste) and sixth (Perle) hulls. The hull form was reshaped and lengthened to  while the superstructure and external bow were made of glass-reinforced plastic. To further reduce noise emissions, the machinery was given flexible mountings. The program included upgrades to the sonar and additional upgrades of the electronics. The Rubis class had a DSUB 62C towed passive sonar array, DUUG 2 sonar intercept, DMUX 20 sonar suite installed and had their acoustic intercept upgraded to DUUX 5. With the upgrades tested and proven, the original four boats were rebuilt to the same standards between 1989 and 1995 and were nearly identical to the final two ships of the class.

Boats

Construction and career

The first hull was laid down in December 1976 and launched in 1979. The first ship cost 850 million French francs to build. The first three vessels originally sported the names Provence, Bretagne and Bourgogne respectively, but their names were changed to their current monikers in November 1980. Rubis was financed via the Third Military Equipment Plan, and the following three hulls were part of the Fourth Military Equipment Plan. Rubis reactor went critical in February 1981 and trials began in June. Hulls five and six were ordered on 17 October 1984 and the seventh on 24 April 1990. However, plans for the eighth submarine of the class were cancelled in September 1991 and construction for the seventh was delayed. Eventually construction of the seventh hull was cancelled in June 1992, but not before the French Navy attempted to sell the vessel as a conventionally-powered submarine, but found no buyers. All six submarines are based at Toulon as part of the Escadrille de sous-marins nucléaires d'attaque.

Saphir was the first to undergo the AMÉTHYSTE rebuild, being out of service from November 1989 to May 1991. Rubis followed from September 1992 to July 1993. On 20 August 1993, Rubis collided with the oil tanker Lyria. From 1993 to 1994, Casabianca underwent the AMÉTHYSTE rebuild.  On 30 March 1994, Émeraude had a steam leakage in the secondary steam loop, suffering ten casualties including the vessel's commanding officer. Émeraude would undergo the AMÉTHYSTE rebuild from May 1994 to December 1995.

During the Péan inter-allied manoeuvres of 1998, Casabianca managed to "sink" the United States Navy aircraft carrier  and the  that was escorting her. In September 2000 Saphir experienced excessive radioactivity in the primary reactor loop forcing the submarine to be withdrawn from service for six months to undergo recoring.

During COMPTUEX 2015, an exercise led by the United States Navy, Saphir successfully defeated the aircraft carrier  and her escort, managing to "sink" the US carrier. This was widely advertised by the French Navy but unmentioned by the US Navy.

On 12 June 2020, Perle caught fire in dry dock while undergoing major renovations. The fire broke out around 10:35 local time in the forward section of the submarine and was described as being "unbelievably fierce". According to French naval sources, there were no weapons or nuclear fuel aboard at the time. In October 2020 it was announced that Perle would be repaired using the forward section of the decommissioned boat, Saphir. The repairs were projected to be completed in 2022 and her return to service is anticipated in 2023.

The French Navy started replacimg the Rubis class with the s in 2020.

Proposed Canada class
The goal was to build up a three-ocean navy and to assert Canadian sovereignty over Arctic waters.

The Rubis class as designed failed to meet the Canadian Statement of Requirement (SOR) as it was noisy underwater and slow. It also came with the caveat that the first 4–5 submarines would have to be built in France. Unlike the British Trafalgar class, the Rubis design did not require United States permission to transfer the nuclear propulsion technology, as the Americans were certain to invoke their veto of the sale to Canada. The French brought back a revision to their design, added an "ice pick" so the submarine could operate under ice and were developing a modification for their torpedo tubes which were too short to use the Mark 48 torpedoes. The purchase was finally abandoned in April 1989 due to opposition to nuclear submarines and high costs, particularly with the end of the Cold War.

See also
 List of submarines of France
 List of submarine classes in service
 Submarine forces (France)
 Future of the French Navy
 Cruise missile submarine

Notes

Citations

References

External links

SSN Rubis Amethyste Class, France

 
Submarine classes of the French Navy
Attack submarines
Ship classes of the French Navy